Laugier is a French surname, and may refer to:

 Laugier of Nice (c. 950–1032), co-lord of Nice.
 Léonce Laugier, Governor General for Inde française in the Second French Colonial Empire under Third Republic
 M. Laugier may refer to one of two French astronomers 
 Paul Auguste Ernest Laugier (1812–1872), active in Paris
 Marguerite Laugier (1896–1976), active in Nice
 Marc-Antoine Laugier (1713–1769), Jesuit priest and architectural theorist
 Pascal Laugier (born 1971), French director and writer
 Sandra Laugier (born 1961), French philosopher

Surnames